Camp Kilpatrick is a juvenile detention camp located in the Santa Monica Mountains of western Los Angeles County, California. The camp is known for its sports program. Most notable is the camp's American football team, the Kilpatrick Mustangs. The 1993 Emmy Award-winning documentary film Gridiron Gang documents the team's 1990 season, and the 2006 film of the same name is loosely based on those events. The Camp Kilpatrick athletics program was ended in August 2012.

References

External links
Story of Sean Porter & the Gridiron Gang

Juvenile detention centers in the United States
Jails in California
Santa Monica Mountains
Buildings and structures in Los Angeles County, California